In qualification for the 2003 Rugby World Cup, a number of positions were available to Oceania nations. Fiji, Samoa and the Tonga would eventually qualify, joining automatic qualifiers Australia and New Zealand.

Round 1a – June, 2001
Cook Islands advanced to Round 3

Final Standings

|- bgcolor="C0FFC0"
|
|2||2||0||0||+106||6
|- 
|
|2||1||0||1||+15||4
|-
|  
|2||0||0||2||-121||2
|}

Match Schedule

Round 1b – June, 2001
Papua New Guinea advanced to Round 3

Final Standings

|- bgcolor="C0FFC0"
|
|2||2||0||0||+44||6
|- 
|
|1||0||0||1||-22||1
|-
|  
|1||0||0||1||-22||1
|}

Match Schedule

Round 2
Top two teams (Fiji and Samoa) qualified to 2003 Rugby World Cup.  Winner (Fiji) to Pool C.  Runner-up (Samoa) to Pool B.  Third place (Tonga) to Round 4.

Final Standings

Match Schedule

Round 3
Papua New Guinea qualified for Round 4.

Round 4
Tonga qualified for Repechage.

References 

2003
2003 Rugby World Cup qualification
World Cup
World Cup